Michoacán, formally Michoacán de Ocampo, officially the Free and Sovereign State of Michoacán de Ocampo, is one of the 32 states which comprise the Federal Entities of Mexico. The state is divided into 113 municipalities and its capital city is Morelia (formerly called Valladolid). The city was named after José María Morelos, a native of the city and one of the main heroes of the Mexican War of Independence.

Michoacán is located in western Mexico, and has a stretch of coastline on the Pacific Ocean to the southwest. It is bordered by the states of Colima and Jalisco to the west and northwest, Guanajuato to the north, Querétaro to the northeast, the State of México to the east, and Guerrero to the southeast.

The name Michoacán is from Nahuatl: Michhuahcān  from michhuah  ("possessor of fish") and -cān  (place of) and means "place of the fishermen" referring to those who fish on Lake Pátzcuaro. In pre-Hispanic times, the area was the home of the Purépecha Empire, which rivaled the Aztec Empire at the time of Spanish encounter. After the Spanish conquest, the empire became a separate province which became smaller over the colonial period. The state and its residents played a major role in the Mexican War of Independence.

Today, the state is still home to a sizable population of Purépecha people as well as minor populations of Otomi and Nahua. 
The economy is based on agriculture, ranching, fishing, mining, and the arts. The major tourism draw for the state is the Lake Pátzcuaro–Tzintzuntzan–Quiroga area, which was the center of the Purépecha Empire; as well as the location of the Tzintzuntzan yácata pyramids. The national and state parks which include the winter grounds of the monarch butterflies (Mariposas Monarca) are located here. Michoacán is known for its Spanish colonial towns. In 1991, Morelia was declared an UNESCO World Heritage Site for its well-preserved colonial buildings, pink stone cathedral, historic center, and aqueduct. Michoacán has eight Pueblos Mágicos; such as the towns of Tlalpujahua and Santa Clara del Cobre. 

Day of the Dead celebrations in some parts of Michoacán, such as the towns of Janitzio and Pátzcuaro, are often considered to be the most elaborate and famous in all of Mexico. The famous Paricutín volcano, which is one of the Seven Natural Wonders of the World, is located near the city of Uruapan. The state is known as "the soul of Mexico".

History

According to archaeological evidence, there has been human habitation within the territory of the Mexican state of Michoacán for at least 10,000 years. In the pre-Hispanic period, there were waves of migration into the area, including the Pirinda, Nahua, Huetamo, Colima, Purépecha and other peoples. There are sites of formal settlements from all Mesoamerican periods. Important sites include El Opeño and those in Curutarán, Tepalcatepec, Apatzingán, Zinapécuaro and Coalcomán. The territory has been inhabited by the Nahua, Otomi, Matlatzinca, Pirinda and Teco peoples as well as the Purépecha.

The main pre-Hispanic civilization of the state is that of the Purépecha, which was centered in the Lake Pátzcuaro area. Before the 13th century, both Nahua and Purépecha peoples were here, sustaining themselves by agriculture and fishing. The Purépecha are descendants of a late arrival of Chichimeca who came from the north. At Lake Patzcuaro, they came upon people with similar cultures to their own but who were more technological and socially advanced. The formation of the Purépechan state in the 13th century, when these people started their own dominion at Uayameo, today Santa Fé de la Laguna, and becoming dominant over the entire Lake Patzcuaro area by the 15th century. Conquest of neighboring tribes and territories occurred between 1401 and 1450, as they absorbed peoples with different cultures and languages into the empire. By the late 15th century, this state rivaled that of the Aztecs, having expanded their territory over much of what is now Michoacán and into part of Colima, Nayarit, Querétaro, Guanajuato, Guerrero and Jalisco. The Aztecs attempted to invade the Purépecha but were repelled. Because of this attack, the Purépecha later denied the Aztecs aid in their defense of Tenochtitlan against the Spanish and the Tlaxcala. The Purépechas are noted by historians to be one of the few rare instances in the Americas were the indigenous people had some experience with metallurgy prior to the arrival of the Europeans, especially coppersmithing and other metal ores located in their empire. Their descendants are still widely regarded for this today.

Prior to the arrival of any Spaniard in the territory, then-ruler Zuanga died of smallpox, presumably carried by one of the Aztec delegations seeking military aid. He was succeeded by Tanganxoan II. The first Spaniard to the area was Cristóbal de Olid. The Spanish destruction of Tenochtitlan and their promise to allow him to remain ruler convinced Tanganxoan II to submit to Spanish rule. But, Nuño de Guzmán reneged on this agreement and killed Tanganxoan II in 1530, a crime for which he was tried and exiled to Spain where he would die in prison.

During the first years of the Conquest, Michoacán was part of the "kingdom of Mexico" which included the current states of Mexico, Querétaro, Hidalgo, Tlaxcala, Oaxaca, Morelos, Guerrero, Veracruz, Tabasco, Michoacán, Guanajuato and parts of San Luis Potosí, Jalisco and Colima. These lands were divided into encomiendas among the conquistadors. The provinces with the largest populations were called Alcaldias Mayores, with Michoacán being one of these, with its capital initially at Tzintzuntzan. Soon after, it was moved to Patzcuaro and eventually settled in what is now Morelia. The provincial and later state capital was founded by viceroy Antonio de Mendoza in 1541. It became the political and ecclesiastical center of the province after the death of Vasco de Quiroga in 1565.

Soon after the Spanish Conquest, evangelists from the Franciscan, Augustinian, Carmelite and other orders established monasteries all over the territory. Some of the best-known are Juan de Moya, Martín de la Coruña and Jacob the Dacian. As first governor, Nuño de Guzmán disrupted and devastated the social and economic order of the area. Vasco de Quiroga succeeded Guzman, bringing Franciscan and Augustinian friars to both evangelize and repair the area's broken economy and social institutions. Quiroga founded the Spanish city of Patzcuaro in 1538, calling it the Ciudad de Mechuacán. For his efforts, Quiroga is still referred to in the Patzcuaro area as "Tata (grandfather) Vasco". The diocese of Michoacán was established in 1536 by Pope Paul III, and its boundaries coincide with the old Purépecha kingdom. Its first bishop was Vasco de Quiroga.

The Universidad Michoacana de San Nicolás de Hidalgo began as the Colegio de San Nicolas Obispo, founded by Vasco de Quiroga in Patzcuaro in 1540. It was originally a seminary for the training of evangelists. It was granted a royal seal in 1543 to become the Real Colegio de San Nicolás Obispo. The school was moved to Morelia in 1580 and was fused with the Colegio de San Miguel Guayangareo. In 1590, its name was changed to the Seminario Tridentino, afterwards to Seminario Conciliar in 1601. By the end of the 17th century, the name returned to Colegio de San Nicolás but its structure was profoundly changed, adding studies such as philosophy, civil law, and others. At the end of the 18th and beginning of the 19th centuries, a number of figures associated with the Mexican War of Independence, such as Miguel Hidalgo y Costilla, José María Morelos and others were associated with this school. By the mid-19th century, the school had been secularized and renamed the Primitivo y Nacional Colegio de San Nicolás de Hidalgo adding studies such as chemistry, physics and other sciences. The current name and organization was adopted after the Mexican Revolution in 1917.

From the 16th to the 18th centuries, Augustinian, Franciscan and Carmelite missions were constructed in the territory as well as civil constructions, especially in the city now known as Morelia. Mining in areas such as Angangueo, Tlalpujahua and Inguaran had begun, as well as the establishment of agricultural and livestock haciendas. The first school of higher education, called the Primera Casa de Altos Estudios en América, was founded by Alonso de la Veracruz in Tiripetío. Michoacán was made a separate province from "Mexico" in 1602. By the mid-17th century, the indigenous population had declined by half. In 1776, the territory of Michoacán was reduced to the area in which the modern states of Michoacán and Colima are now. Soon after, Colima split to join with the province of Guadalajara, leaving Michoacán roughly with the territory it has today.

During the entire colonial period, the economy was concentrated in the hands of the Spanish-born, who held vast lands and haciendas. They also held the rights over minerals mined in places such as Tlalpujahua, Angangueo and Huetamo. Indigenous peoples were exploited for their work, and slavery was not uncommon. Education was restricted for only those born in Spain and their descendants and was controlled by the Church. The main educational institutions were the Colegio de San Nicolas, founded in the 16th century; and the Seminary of San Pedro and San Pablo, founded in the 18th century. These schools produced a number of distinguished men, but the best-known is Miguel Hidalgo y Costilla.
At the end of the 18th century, ideas from Europe began to infiltrate the upper classes of the state, especially in Valladolid (Morelia) and Zamora. These would eventually lead to the Mexican War of Independence in the early 18th century. This war was foreshadowed by the 1809 conspiracy in Valladolid.

One of the early and main protagonists of the war, Miguel Hidalgo y Costilla, was educated as a priest in the state and began to disseminate Enlightenment ideas here. Soon after Hidalgo performed the Grito de Dolores in Dolores (now Dolores Hidalgo), Guanajuato, a number of people influenced by his thought took up arms against the colonial government. These included Manuel de la Torre Lloreda, Gertrudis Bocanegra, José María Garcia Obeso and Ignacio López Rayón. During his campaign, Hidalgo returned to Valladolid, issuing a decree eliminating slavery.

After Hidalgo's death, much of the insurgency and spies against the Spanish viceroy were located in Michoacán, with documents such as the "Primera Constitución o Decreto Constitucional para la Libertad de la América Mexicana" (First Constitution or Constitutional Decree for the Liberty of the Mexican America) and "Sentimentos de la Nacion", both of which would shape constitutions and governments in the years to come. The first Mexican Supreme Court was also founded here. The Mexican War of Independence was culminated by the army of Agustín de Iturbide, also a Michoacán native, who took Morelia in May 1821.

After the war ended in 1821, the territory of Michoacán became the "Free and Sovereign State of Michoacán on January 31, 1824. This state was initially divided into 4 departments and 22 portions (partidos) under the Ley Territorial of 1825, with the first constitution ratified in the same year. The name of the capital was changed from Valladolid to Morelia at the same time.

In 1831, the state was reorganized into 61 municipalities and 207 locales (tenencias). Due to the struggle between centralists and federalists in Mexico in the 19th century, Michoacán's rights as an entity would change depending on who was in control. The state was declared a department in 1836 but became a more independent state again in 1846. Colima broke off from Michoacán to form its own state in this year. In 1849, the municipality of Coyuca was separated to form the state of Guerrero. In 1853, the state became a department again, regaining state status in 1856. In 1857, Contepec was separated from the state of Guanajuato and attached to Michoacán. In 1863, the diocese of Michoacán was reduced in size, but its status was also elevated to archdiocese.

During the French Intervention in Mexico, Morelia was taken by French forces in 1863. Since resistance to the French was particularly strong here, punitive acts were undertaken by the French in places like Zitácuaro, where much of the city was burned. One of the first victories against the French during the Intervention occurred in Zamora.

In 1907, Michoacán's boundaries changed again with the addition of the communities of Pungarabato and Zirandaro added from Guerrero state to make the Balsas River a natural border. The Mexican Revolution came to Michoacán in 1911, when those loyal to Francisco I. Madero proclaimed Santa Clara del Cobre as their territory, then went on to take towns around Lake Patzcuaro under the leadership of Salvador Escalante. The governor of the state, Aristeo Mendoza, resigned. Fighting among various factions would continue in parts of the state for the rest of the war. The state's current constitution was ratified in 1918. In 1920, the Universidad Michoacana de San Nicolás de Hidalgo was founded.

Soon after the end of the Revolution, the Cristero War would affect the state, which affected agricultural production and distribution. In 1926, hostilities closed the seminaries in Morelia and Zamora. Near the end of the war, Lázaro Cárdenas was elected governor of the state and served until 1932; he became president of Mexico in 1934.

Michoacán has been badly affected by the Mexican Drug War, due to its methamphetamine and marijuana production. That resulted in the start of an anti-drug trafficking campaign in 2006, an anti-narcotics operation since 2006, grenade attacks in 2008, a shootout in 2015 as well as a massacre and clashes in 2019.

Geography

The state is located in the center west of the Mexican Republic, on the extreme southwest of the central highlands. It borders the states of Mexico, Querétaro, Guerrero, Guanajuato, Jalisco and Colima, with a  coastline on the Pacific Ocean. It also has  of marine territory off its Pacific coast.

The state is crossed by the Sierra Madre del Sur, the Trans-Mexican Volcanic Belt and the Inter-mountain Valleys region. It is considered to be a continuation of the Sierra Madre Occidental. The Trans-Mexican Volcanic Belt crosses the state from west to east toward the Toluca Valley and Valley of Mexico. This mountain range is marked by appearance of many volcanoes, active, dormant, and extinct alike. This system is subdivided into regions such as the Sierra de Tancítaro, Sierra de Periban, Sierra de San Angel and others. The best-known volcano in this region is the Paricutín volcano. 

The state has a large number of lakes, waterfalls, lagoons, hot springs, and a natural system of waterways, including parts of two of the country's largest rivers, the Lerma and the Balsas. These waterways are divided into three regions, called the North, Central and South. The North region includes the Lerma Basin. On the Lerma River is the Tepuxtepec Dam which has a capacity of 371 million m3. Rivers that empty into the Lerma in Michoacán include the Tlalpuhahua, Cachivi and Duero. The two main rivers that feed this lake are the Grande de Morelia and Queréndaro.

The Central region is represented by lakes Pátzcuaro and Zirahuén. Lake Pátzcuaro has a surface area of 1,525 km2. This lake is fed by a number of surface and subterranean water flows with the principal rivers leading here including the San Gregorio and Chapultepec. This lake has five islands within it called Janitzio, Yunuén, La Pacanda, Tecuén, Jarácuaro, Urandén and Carián. These two lakes are considered to be the main tourist attraction of the state.

Most of the state's rivers and streams are located in the south region of the state, with the Balsas River being the most important. The most important tributaries of this river include the Cutzamala, Carácuaro and Tepalcatepec rivers. Within this region is the coastal watershed, which is the area between the Sierra Madre del Sur and the coastline. This area includes small rivers such as the Coahuayana, Aquila, Ostula, Motín del Oro, Coire, Cachán and Nexpa which flow directly into the Pacific.

Much of the climate of the state is determined by altitude and other geographical features. Lower temperatures correspond with the highland areas in the north and east while the lower south and west, called La Costa (the coast) or Tierra Caliente (hot land) register higher temperatures. The lowest temperatures are registered in highland areas such as the Sierra de Coalcomán and the Sierra del Centro located near the border with the State of Mexico. Except for the Tierra Caliente, most of the state can experience freezing temperatures in the winter. Rainfall is also dependent on altitude with the lowlands receiving less rain than the mountain areas. There is a well-defined rainy season which extends from June to October over the entire state.

Flora
Ecosystems vary by altitude. Between , there are mixed forests and below this are broadleaf or tropical forests. Tree species include oak, cedar, and pine. Mango trees can be found in the eastern and western regions.

Fauna

Animal types vary from region to region but among mammals these can be found: skunks, raccoons, cacomistle, coyotes, lynxes, rabbits, bats, deer, armadillos, mountain lions, foxes, and jaguars. The latter is an important symbol in Purépecha culture. Numerous bird species can be found including water fowl such as ducks, storks and seabirds along the coast. Eagles, parrots, and hawks are found in the tropical and mountainous regions. Both owls and hummingbirds are important cultural symbols to the Purépecha. It is also one of three Mexican states where the tarantula species Brachypelma hamorii is found, the other two being Jalisco and Colima.
Tiger sharks, thresher sharks, and porpoises can be found in coastal waters. Reptiles including crocodiles, sea turtles, iguanas, snakes, and caimans can be found in the waterways and along the coastal regions. Michoacán includes critical over-wintering habitat for most of the monarch butterflies from eastern North America. To the Purépechas, the monarch butterfly symbolizes the spirits of the dead as they journey from the afterlife.

Protected areas
Protected areas in Michoacán include Barranca del Cupatitzio, 
Bosencheve, Cerro de Garnica, Insurgente José María Morelos, Lago de Camécuaro, and Rayón national parks, Monarch Butterfly and Zicuirán-Infiernillo biosphere reserves, and Pico de Tancítaro Flora and Fauna Protection Area. Lake Pátzcuaro and Zacapu Lagoon are Ramsar Sites, designated wetlands of international importance.

Economy

The economy of the state is based on agriculture, ranching, forest products, fishing and crafts. Most of the population is employed in three sectors: agriculture (34%), mining and manufacturing (23%), and commerce (37%).

Agriculture 
Agriculture occupies over a million hectares of land in the state or 20% of the land area. Three-fifths of this agriculture occurs only during the rainy season. Irrigation farming is restricted to areas such as the Apatzingán Valley, the Bajío area of Michoacán, the Zamora Valley and some others. Principal crops include corn, sorghum, avocados, strawberries, peaches, wheat, limes, sugar cane and mangos. While corn accounts for 43% of the crops harvested, Michoacán is the largest producer of avocados in Mexico and in the world. Forty three percent of farmland in the territory is dedicated to the raising of livestock, including cattle, domestic fowl, sheep, goats and pigs. In 2007, the state's production of meat, dairy and eggs was valued at over four billion pesos.

Forestry 
Sixty percent of the state is covered in forest, with the most economically important of these located in the higher elevations at the eastern side. These forests mostly produce lumber and resin. These areas are estimated at 2,160,000 hectares, over half of which is pine forest. The most productive forests are located in the central and eastern portions of the state. Rainforest areas are estimated at 460,500 hectares. One problem facing the forested areas of the state is unsustainable logging. In addition to exploitable forest, there are also ecological reserves with tourist importance, especially the various monarch butterfly sanctuaries in the extreme east of the state.

Fishing 

Michoacán's lakes, rivers and coastline make it an important producer of fish and seafood, both caught in the wild and farmed. The most important commercial fishing is for tilapia and carp.

Mining and minerals 
Mining is an important economic activity in the state, which is mostly concentrated on the eastern side near the Mexico State border.  However, iron is mined in the Lázaro Cárdenas area near the coast. Both metallic and non-metallic minerals are mined in the state. These include silver, gold, zinc, cadmium, lead, iron, copper, fill dirt, sand, gravel, lime, limestone, marble, and others. There are thirteen principal mining areas: Tlalpujahua, Angangueo, Los Azufres, Real de Otzumatlán, Tzitzio, Tiámaro, El Bastán, San Diego Curucupacéo, Inguarán, Las Truchas, and La Minita de Coalcomán. Michoacán is the second-largest producer of coke and third-largest producer of iron, which are essential to the steel industry, in Mexico. While there remains significant metallic deposits, their mining only contributes 1.64% to the economy.

Manufacturing 
Most industrial activity is concentrated in the central region of the state, near the capital, where a number of industrial parks are located, such as Ciudad Industrial Morelia. However. there are other areas with industry, such as Apatzingán, Zamora, Jiquilpan and Sahuayo, as well as in the Lázaro Cárdenas area. Major production areas are iron and steel (34.27%), bottling (10.43%) and paper products (8.36%).
Most people in the state are employed in service and commerce, and this sector contributes 19.07% to the overall economy. Most sales are in foodstuffs, drinks and tobacco.

Infrastructure

Transport
Major highways in the state include Federal Highway 15 and the Morelia-Patzcuaro highway. Intercity and interstate buses provide connections to places within the state and the rest of Mexico. About 91% of these bus lines are second class while just under nine percent are first class. Most rail lines are limited to the north and center of the state, providing freight service to Mexico City and Guadalajara. The state's main port is the city of Lázaro Cárdenas which contains  of dock space. The dock is used mostly for the shipping of minerals and grains. There are two major international airports, Morelia International Airport and Uruapan International Airport. Smaller facilities exist in Zamora and Lázaro Cárdenas. The state has abundant hydroelectrical production due to dams on the Balsas River, the Lerma River and the Tepalcatepec River.

Media
One notable actress from Santa Elena, Michoacán is Elpidia Carrillo. She is best known for starring in the 1987 science fiction horror film Predator alongside Arnold Schwarzenegger.

As of 1995, the state had eight television stations, with seven out of operation. There is a system of educational television with 528 broadcast antennas.

Newspapers and news sites of Michoacán de Ocampo include: La Opinión de Apatzingán, a. m. de La Piedad, Diario ABC de Michoacán, El Diario Grande de Michoacán Provincia, El Sol de Morelia, El Sol de Zamora, Frecuencia Informativa Escrita  , La Jornada Michoacán, La Opinión de Michoacán, La Voz de Michoacán.

Education
The state provides public education from preschool level to high school.  "Formal preschool" is offered in communities which have twenty five or more qualified students. Less formal preschools are operated in smaller communities. As of 1996, there were 5,433 primary schools serving 705,694 students with 25,485 teachers. There is a failure rate from grade to grade of about 9.7% with just under five percent leaving school permanently before finishing primary studies. The most common reason for departure is poverty. At the secondary level there are 174,354 students, which represent 22% of these eligible to attend. High school level studies are mostly geared to vocational studies and many attend via distance education. There are 24 public and private institutions of higher learning offering 49 different majors. Eight are technical colleges, four for teachers, the Universidad Michoacana de San Nicolás de Hidalgo, the Instituto Michoacano de Ciencias de la Educación and ten private institutions.

The Universidad Michoacana de San Nicolás de Hidalgo is located in Morelia. Its historical predecessor was founded in 1540, making it one of the oldest institutions of higher education in the Americas.

Tourism

Carnitas are originally from Michoacán. Other traditional foods include cotija cheese, guacamole,  morisqueta, tamales, pozole, enchiladas, mole sauce, and various sweets such as pan de muerto and chocolate champurrado (during the Day of the Dead celebrations), ice cream, churros, and ate, a kind of Mexican jelly made of many typical fruits.

The state ministry of tourism has divided the state into regions, mostly based on the major cities of Morelia, Uruapan, Lázaro Cárdenas, Patzcuaro, Zamora and Zitácuaro. The state contains a large number of potential attractions, most of which are classified as suitable for ecotourism. However, only 6.2% of these sites are visited by international tourists. Most visitors to sites are from within the state.

The Morelia region stresses its cultural and artistic heritage, especially its colonial architecture . The most important colonial structures are in Morelia and built in the 18th century. These include the cathedral, finished in 1744 and the main aqueduct finished at the end of the century. This architecture has made the city a World Heritage Site. In addition to the state capital, the region includes towns such as Charo, Capula, Tiripetio, Cuitzeo and Huandacareo, which contain archaeological sites, water parks and traditional cuisine. The rural areas of this zone contain more than 400 thermal springs, many of which have been turned into recreational areas and parks.  These include Reino de Atzimba, Cointzio, Huandacareo and El Ejido. Morelia holds the annual Festival Internacional de Música de Morelia. The festival consists of more than forty concerts with over 500 artists from Michoacán and from around the world. Other festivals include the popular SalsaMich that features a 3-day Salsa dance competition. The Festival Internacional de Cine de Morelia is celebrated annually that is dedicated to Mexican cinema. The Plaza Monumental de Morelia was established in 1951, which was destined exclusively for bullfights. Nowadays, the ring also hosts concerts, lucha libre, and weddings.

The Uruapan region stresses its cultural and natural heritage. The city is one of the oldest settlements in the state, which was initially settled by the Meseta Purépecha. This city contains a number of attractions such as La Huatápera, colonial era hospital founded by Vasco de Quiroga, the Temple of San Francisco and the Eduardo Ruiz Municipal Museum. One other attraction is the narrowest house in the world as documented by the Guinness Book of World Records. Other important cities in the region are Apatzingán and Caracha.
Uruapan is surrounded by hundreds of hectares of forests and by fertile fields growing fruits and flowers, many of which only grow here. Some of the natural attractions of the zone include the Santa Catarina Dam and the La Tzaráacua and La Tzararacuita waterfalls. Smaller towns and villages in this region are known for their religious and popular festivals, many of which occur in the summer. Examples of these are the feasts of Señor del Calvario in Quinceo, of San Mateo Ahuiran in Paracho and the National Guitar Festival in Paracho. The best-known town in the region is San Juan Nuevo Parangaricutiro, which was founded due to the destruction of its original namesake by the eruption of the Paricutín volcano. The pre-Hispanic sites of Tingambato and Taretan are in this zone as well, which were important Purépecha cities.

The town of Paracho is well known throughout both Mexico and elsewhere in the world as a hub of lutherie. This is because the town's craftsmen are reputed to making the best sounding guitars and vihuelas in all of Mexico. The town is full of music shops that sell ten-string mandolins, armadillo-backed guitars (concheras), acoustic bass guitars; as well as regular classical guitars and mandolins, bajo sextos, vihuelas, guitarrones and many others. Many of the stores and workshops allow visitors to watch the guitar-making process directly.    

The Lázaro Cárdenas region is named after Michoacán's largest port and oceanside city. Here the state stresses the kilometres of beaches and other natural areas in which to practice ecotourism and extreme sports. Beaches include Maruata, Faro de Bucerías, the Pichi Estuary, La Laguna de Mezcala, La Ticla and Nexpa, with the last two considered suitable for surfing, with their regular two-three-meter waves. A number of these beaches are protected areas, due to being a breeding ground for sea turtles.

The Patzcuaro region is extremely important to the state due to its history of having been the center of the Purépecha Empire as well as the first capital of the colonial province of Michoacán. Its pre-Hispanic heritage is evident by the Tzintzuntzan and Ihuatizo sites as well as the large number of people who still speak the Purépecha language and maintain pre-Hispanic customs. Vasco de Quiroga established the first capital at Patzcuaro and was instrumental to building the colonial era economy of the Lake Patzcuaro area. The lake is surrounded by mountains and forests as well as the towns of Cuanajo, Tupátaro, Eronguícuaro and Quiroga. These towns are noted for their crafts and popular religious festivals such as the feast of the Señor del Rescate in Tzintzuntzan, Holy Week, and especially Noche de Muertos or Night of the Dead. This area is the most important to the state with the most visited town, Patzcuaro with its basilica and museums.

One of the largest tourist events in the state is Noche de Muertos or Night of the Dead. This is celebrated on the dates around November 2. Essentially, these are Day of the Dead celebrations, which are celebrated all over Mexico, but with unique variations. The events of these days show a blending of both pre-Hispanic and Catholic beliefs and traditions. Noche de Muertos is celebrated most strongly in the towns and villages around Lake Patzcuaro such as Tzintzuntzan, Ihuatzio, Janitzio, as well as Patzcuaro itself, which was the center of the Purépecha Empire. As in other parts of Mexico, altars to the dead, both in homes and on graves are erected and covered with offerings such as bread, fruit and other items. One aspect which is unique to the event here is the lighting and floating of hundreds of small candles and flowers on Lake Patzcuaro on the night between November 1 and 2. It is also believed that on this night the ghosts of Mintzita, the daughter of Purépecha king Tzintzicha, and Itzihuapa arise. Their story is similar to that of Romeo and Juliet as they were never able to marry due to the Spanish invasion of their lands. Today, it is said that the two rise up and head toward a specific cemetery to receive visitors. There are a number of other rituals performed on these days such as the Terescuan y Campaneri, a kind of treasure hunt for hidden harvest items.

The Zamora region is center of the city of the same name in an area known as the Purépecha Mesa. Pre-Hispanic language and customs are preserved here as well as a large number of crafts such as the pottery of Ptamban and the embroidery of Tarecuato. The region is part of an area of Mexico known as the Bajío and has extensive agriculture, livestock and some industry. Regional dishes such as pigs' feet, breads baked in wood fired ovens, tamales, pozole and dishes made with avocados and corn are promoted here. Important towns outside of Zamora include Camécuaro, Orandiro, La Estancia and La Alberca. The city of Zamora is home to one of the oldest cultures in the west of Mexico which dates to about 1750 BCE, known as the Opeño.  The Spanish city was founded as a military garrison.

The Zitacuaro region contains approximately a half million hectares of conifer forests, but is best known as being part of the wintering grounds of the monarch butterfly. The area is filled with old mining towns as well as an important archaeological site. The region is home to the Mazahua and Otomi peoples, many of whom produce crafts such as blankets, rebozos and ceramics. The city of Zitacuaro is the site of an important battle during the French Intervention in Mexico, which gives it the title of "Heroic City". Other important communities include Añgangueo, San Matias and Ciudad Hidalgo. The most important places to see monarch butterflies in the winter are in municipalities of Angangeo and Ocampo. The butterfly sanctuaries are called El Rosario, Cerro Campanario, Sierra Chincua and El Llanno de las Papas. In 2008, UNESCO declared this region part of a Monarch Butterfly Biosphere Reserve.

Crime
Due to crime, the United States Bureau of Consular Affairs advises not to travel to Michoacán (April 2021). During the COVID-19 pandemic, while the Mexican government was occupied, cartels took advantage as an opportunity to gain more power. Tancítaro has assembled the CUSEPT, civilian gunmen funded by local avocado growers, to protect against organized crime. Such non-governmental police groups have been formed because local police are sometimes seen as unhelpful or complicit. Turf disputes happen too.

Killings
Homicide happens frequently in Michoacán.
On 26–28 October 2019, 9 people and 4 police were killed in a firefight from a search warrant.
9 people, 3 of whom were children, were killed in a video game arcade on February 3, 2020.

Kidnappings and Ransoms
There have been aggressive disputes in the area,such as those over avocados.

Drug Cartels
La Familia Michoacana, Jalisco New Generation Cartel, Los Zetas, Beltrán-Leyva Organization, the Knights Templar Cartel and Cárteles Unidos operate in Michoacán.

Police and Militia
Operation Michoacán takes place in Michoacán. There are militias in Michoacán.

Demographics

Michoacán is the seventh most populated state in Mexico and the average resident has a life expectancy of 73.3 years. It is estimated that each year about 40,000 people immigrate to the state while 78,000 leave, leading to population loss. Of those who leave, about one third go to other places in Mexico and the rest to other countries, principally the United States. The cities with the densest populations are Morelia, Uruapan and Zamora. The majority of the population are mestizos; meaning that they are part indigenous, part European (mainly from Spain), and some African. Michoacán is one of the most Catholic regions in Mexico.

Charreada is an important sport in the state. It celebrates the mestizo culture and heritage of Michoacán; in which the Spaniards employed the indigenous people as vaqueros or ranchers to herd cattle. During the Mexican Revolution, both sides used charros as soldiers. They were also used to maintain order against bandits. The typical Michoacán charro outfit consists of tight, embroidered pants and jacket, dress shirt, chaps, a cloak-like sarape, and a sombrero.

Michoacán has a history of European immigrants including: Italians, Spaniards, and the French. There are small Italian communities found throughout the state including the cities of Nueva Italia, Michoacán and Lombardia in Michoacán, both founded by Dante Cusi from Gambar in Brescia.
During the Spanish Civil War, 456 children from Spain arrived in Morelia as refugees. Most of them stayed even after the war concluded.

The indigenous population is estimated at just over seven percent of the total, with most living in 29 municipalities.  Many are Purépecha, which are located in the Meseta-Cañada, Patzcuaro Lake, Zirahuén Lake, and Zacapu regions. In the east of the state, in the municipalities of Ocampo, Anguangueo, Tuxpan, Hidalgo, Maravatío and Zitácuaro, there is a mix of Mazahua, Otomi and Purépecha. On the coast can be found the Aquila, Chinicuila and Coahuayana peoples. The Purépecha are seen as Michoacán's most devoted Catholics; as well as mixing traditional indigenous elements such as Noche de Muertos.

According to the 2020 Census, 1.55% of Michoacán's population identified as Black, Afro-Mexican, or of African descent.

Municipalities 

Michoacán, as all states of Mexico, is divided into municipalities (municipios), creating 113 municipalities of Michoacán.

Major communities 

Apatzingán
Churumuco
Ciudad Hidalgo
Coalcomán
Cotija
Jacona de Plancarte
Jiquilpan
Jungapeo
La Huacana
La Piedad de Cavadas
Lázaro Cárdenas
Los Reyes
Maravatio
Morelia
Nueva Italia
Pátzcuaro
Puruandiro
Quiroga
Sahuayo de Morelos
Santa Ana Maya
Santa Ines
Tacámbaro
Tangancícuaro
Tepalcatepec
Uruapan
Venustiano Carranza
Villa Madero
Villamar
Yurécuaro
Zacapu
Zamora de Hidalgo
Zináparo
Zinapécuaro
Zitácuaro

See also

Index: Natural history of Michoacán
Ghosts in Mexican culture
Tarascan state
La Familia Michoacana

References

External links 

Michoacán state government (Adobe Flash)
Michoacán, The Soul of Mexico  
Municipalities of Michoacán site (Adobe Flash)

 
States and territories established in 1823
States of Mexico